is a 1995 football video game that was released by Hudson Soft exclusively in Japan. It is a sequel to J.League Super Soccer.

Summary

Gameplay
J.League Super Soccer '95: Jikkyō Stadium featured all clubs from the top division of Japan Professional Football League J.League Division 1 (1995 J.League season). The players can choose from two distinctive views for gameplay. These views include a left-right perspective and a top-down perspective.

Audio
The main feature was the inclusion of chants from each team.

Reception
On release, Famicom Tsūshin scored the game a 28 out of 40.

See also
 SNES Multitap

References

1995 video games
Hudson Soft games
Japan-exclusive video games
Association football video games
J.League licensed video games
Super Nintendo Entertainment System games
Super Nintendo Entertainment System-only games
Video games developed in Japan
Video games set in 1995
Video games set in Japan
Video game sequels
Multiplayer and single-player video games